Augusto Jordán Rodas Andrade (born 25 September 1968) is a Guatemalan lawyer and civil servant who was served as Ombudsman of Guatemala since 2017 until 2022.

References 

Living people
1968 births
People from Quetzaltenango Department
Universidad de San Carlos de Guatemala alumni
Human rights in Guatemala
21st-century Guatemalan judges
Ombudspersons in Guatemala
Movement for the Liberation of Peoples politicians